Auriculella ambusta is a species of air-breathing tropical land snail, a terrestrial pulmonate gastropod mollusc in the family Achatinellidae. This species is endemic to the Hawaiian islands.

References

Auriculella
Molluscs of Hawaii
Taxonomy articles created by Polbot